Jorge Fábregas (born March 13, 1970) is an American former professional baseball catcher who played for eight teams during a nine-year Major League Baseball (MLB) career.

Career
Fábregas an alumnus of the University of Miami. In 1989, he played collegiate summer baseball with the Wareham Gatemen of the Cape Cod Baseball League, and returned to the league in 1990 to play with the Hyannis Mets.

Drafted by the California Angels in the first round of the 1991 Major League Baseball Draft, Fábregas made his MLB debut with the California Angels on April 24, . He played his final MLB game, at the age of 32, on September 27, with the Milwaukee Brewers.

Fábregas played for the California/Anaheim Angels (1994-, -2002), Chicago White Sox (1997), Arizona Diamondbacks, New York Mets (1998), Florida Marlins,  Atlanta Braves (1999), Kansas City Royals and Milwaukee Brewers (2002)

With the exception of two seasons during his nine-year career, Fábregas was a back-up catcher. His career batting average was .241 and he had 23 career home runs.

References

External links

1970 births
Living people
American expatriate baseball players in Canada
Anaheim Angels players
Arizona Diamondbacks players
Atlanta Braves players
Baseball players from Miami
California Angels players
Chicago White Sox players
Durham Bulls players
Florida Marlins players
Hyannis Harbor Hawks players
Kansas City Royals players
Milwaukee Brewers players
Major League Baseball catchers
Miami Hurricanes baseball players
Midland Angels players
New York Mets players
Omaha Golden Spikes players
Palm Springs Angels players
Tucson Sidewinders players
Vancouver Canadians players
Wareham Gatemen players